Orchestra Hall may refer to:
Orchestra Hall, part of Symphony Center in Chicago
Orchestra Hall (Detroit, Michigan)
Orchestra Hall (Minneapolis, Minnesota)

See also
Symphony Hall (disambiguation)

Architectural disambiguation pages